Euthyatira is a genus of moths in the subfamily Thyatirinae. It was first described by Smith in 1891.

Species
Euthyatira lorata (Grote, 1881)
Euthyatira pryeri (Butler, 1881)
Euthyatira pudens (Guenée, 1852)
Euthyatira semicircularis (Grote, 1881)

References

Thyatirinae
Drepanidae genera